Quiet Days in Clichy, is a Danish film released in 1970 which was written and directed by Jens Jørgen Thorsen. Set in Paris, it features music by Country Joe McDonald and Ben Webster. Drawn from the semi-autobiographical 1956 novel by Henry Miller, updated from the 1930s to the 1960s, it gives reflections on and incidents in the lives of two young men sharing an apartment. The amount of nudity, sexual activity and crude language in the film has restricted its public showing in many countries.

Plot
The American writer Joey and his European friend Carl share an apartment in the Clichy-sous-Bois district of Paris in the late 1960s. What spare time and money they have is mostly spent pursuing women.

A surrealist artist comes to their apartment, offers her services and paints slogans over the walls of the bathroom. In a café, Joey meets the amiable Nys and they go to a hotel. In the street afterwards, when she asks for money he gives her all he has got. Left with nothing for his dinner, he roams the streets of the city in increasing hunger and distress. Returning in despair to the empty apartment, he is reduced to picking stale food out of the bin. Trying vainly to sleep, he is woken by Carl who has brought back Colette, an underage runaway to whom they give a home. Joey has further dates with Nys, without charge because she enjoys his company. Colette's parents eventually track her down and reclaim her, telling Carl and Joey they will not inform the police so long as the two never see the girl again.

Thinking it prudent to leave France for a while, the two men take a train to Luxembourg which they find picturesque but dull. When a bar owner tells them his establishment is free of Jews, they beat him up and return quickly to Paris. There Joey meets the exotic Mara, who claims to have had a brilliant career in Costa Rica but is temporarily reduced to prostituting herself on the Champs-Élysées. Carl brings back two prostitutes from a jazz bar, both called Christine, and the five have a wild night. Later, Carl and Joey have fun with two Danish visitors, one of whom keeps proclaiming her unavailability because she is a married woman with two children.

Cast 
 Paul Valjean: Joey
 Wayne Rodda: Carl
 Ulla Koppel: Nys
 Lisbet Lundquist: Jeanne
 Elsebeth Reingaard: Colette
 Olaf Ussing: Father
 Noemie Roos: Mother
 Ben Webster: Ben Webster
 Avi Sagild: Mara
 Susanne Krage: Christine
 Louise White: Surrealist
 Petronella: Adrienne

See also 
 Quiet Days in Clichy (1990 film)

References

External links 

1970s erotic drama films
Danish erotic drama films
Films based on American novels
Films based on works by Henry Miller
1970 drama films
1970 films
English-language Danish films
1970s English-language films
1970s French-language films
1970 multilingual films
Danish multilingual films
Seine-Saint-Denis